Pieter Merlier (born 29 March 1979) is a Belgian football goalkeeper, currently under contract at SK Berlare.

Merlier previously played for S.V. Zulte Waregem in the Belgian First Division.

Honours
Zulte Waregem
Belgian Second Division: 2004–05
Belgian Cup: 2005–06

External links

References

1979 births
Living people
Belgian footballers
S.V. Zulte Waregem players
Maccabi Herzliya F.C. players
Expatriate footballers in Israel
FC Universitatea Cluj players
FC U Craiova 1948 players
Expatriate footballers in Romania
Belgian expatriate sportspeople in Romania
Belgian expatriate footballers
Belgian Pro League players
Liga I players
Israeli Premier League players
People from Waregem
Association football goalkeepers
Footballers from West Flanders